Microplocia is a genus of beetles in the family Cerambycidae, containing the following species:

 Microplocia borneensis Breuning, 1956
 Microplocia puncticollis Heller, 1924
 Microplocia sybroides Breuning, 1942
 Microplocia tonkinensis Breuning, 1963

References

Apomecynini